Alan Birch (born 12 August 1956) is an English former professional footballer who played as a winger, making over 400 career appearances.

Career
Born in West Bromwich, Birch played for Walsall, Chesterfield, Wolverhampton Wanderers, Barnsley, Rotherham United, Scunthorpe United, Stockport County and Frickley Athletic.

Personal life
His brother Paul played for Aston Villa and Wolverhampton Wanderers.

References

1956 births
Living people
English footballers
Walsall F.C. players
Chesterfield F.C. players
Wolverhampton Wanderers F.C. players
Barnsley F.C. players
Rotherham United F.C. players
Scunthorpe United F.C. players
Stockport County F.C. players
Frickley Athletic F.C. players
English Football League players
Association football midfielders
Sportspeople from West Bromwich